The 2005 Prince Edward Island Scott Tournament of Hearts was held Jan. 21–26 in at the Crapaud Community Curling Club in Crapaud, Prince Edward Island. The winning team was Team Rebecca Jean MacPhee who represented Prince Edward Island, finished with a 4-7 round-robin record at the 2005 Scott Tournament of Hearts in St. John's, Newfoundland and Labrador.

Teams

Draw 1
January 21, 9:00 AM AT

Draw 2
January 21, 2:00 PM AT

Draw 3
January 21, 7:00 PM AT

Draw 4
January 22, 9:00 AM AT

Draw 5
January 22, 2:00 PM AT

A Side Final
January 22, 7:00 PM AT

Draw 6
January 22, 7:00 PM AT

Draw 7
January 25, 11:00 AM AT

Draw 8
January 25, 3:00 PM AT

B Side Final
January 25, 7:00 PM AT

Draw 9
January 25, 7:00 PM AT

Draw 10
January 26, 2:00 PM AT

C Side Final
January 26, 7:00 PM AT

Final
January 27, 10:00 AM AT  Not Needed

 Team MacPhee won A, B and C finals therefore a championship final was not needed.

References

Prince Edward Island Scott Tournament Of Hearts, 2005
Curling competitions in Prince Edward Island
2005 in Prince Edward Island